Marriages is a Canadian drama film, directed by Catherine Martin and released in 2001. The film centres on Yvonne (Marie-Ève Bertrand), a young girl in 19th-century Quebec whose life is turned upside down by both her own sexual awakening and the apparent return of her mother, who died giving birth to her.

The film's cast also includes Guylaine Tremblay, Hélène Loiselle, David Boutin, Mirianne Brûlé and Raymond Cloutier.

Critical response
The film was named to the Toronto International Film Festival's annual Canada's Top Ten list for 2001, and Martin received a Genie Award nomination for Best Screenplay at the 22nd Genie Awards.

References

External links

2001 films
2000s French-language films
Canadian coming-of-age drama films
Films directed by Catherine Martin
2000s coming-of-age drama films
2001 drama films
French-language Canadian films
2000s Canadian films